Jeanne de Bourbon (1465 – 22 January 1511) was a daughter of John II, Count of Vendôme and Isabelle de Beauvau.

Family and lineage
She was a daughter of John II, Count of Vendôme and Isabelle de Beauvau. Her maternal grandparents were Louis de Beauvau, Seneschal of Anjou and Marguerite de Chambley.

Her paternal grandparents were Louis, Count of Vendôme and Jeanne of Laval. Louis had served as both Grand Chamberman of France and Grand Master of France. He was a prominent member of the Armagnac party.

Marriages and issues
She married first John II, Duke of Bourbon in 1487. The groom was about sixty-one years old and the bride only twenty-two. John had survived two previous wives and his only son. He was in a need of an heir; however, they had only one son:

Louis, Count of Clermont (1488). He was the desired heir but did not long survive his birth.

John II died the same year as his second and last known son.

Jeanne remained a widow for seven years. On 11 January 1495, Jeanne married her second husband John III, Count of Auvergne. They had:
 Anne, married John Stewart, 2nd Duke of Albany.
 Madeleine, married Lorenzo II, Duke of Urbino. She was the mother of Catherine de' Medici.

John III died on 28 March 1501.

On March 27, 1503 she married her third and final husband, François de La Pause, baron de la Garde. They had no children.

References

Sources

External links

Listing of medieval members of the House of Bourbon

1465 births
1511 deaths
Jeanne
15th-century French nobility
15th-century French women
15th-century French people
16th-century French nobility
16th-century French women